South Lake School District is a school district headquartered in St. Clair Shores, Michigan in Greater Detroit. The district serves St. Clair Shores and portions of Eastpointe and Grosse Pointe Shores. The district formerly served portions of Lake Township.

Schools
Secondary
 South Lake High School (St. Clair Shores)
 South Lake Middle School (St. Clair Shores)
Primary
 Avalon Elementary School (St. Clair Shores)
 Elmwood Elementary School (St. Clair Shores)
 Koepsell Elementary School (Eastpointe)

References

External links

 South Lake School District

School districts in Michigan
Education in Macomb County, Michigan